The general selection model (GSM) is a model of population genetics that describes how a population's allele frequencies will change when acted upon by natural selection.

Equation
The General Selection Model applied to a single gene with two alleles (let's call them A1 and A2) is encapsulated by the equation:

   
where:

 is the frequency of allele A1
 is the frequency of allele A2
 is the rate of evolutionary change of the frequency of allele A2
 are the relative fitnesses of homozygous A1, heterozygous (A1A2), and homozygous A2 genotypes respectively.
 is the mean population relative fitness.

In words:

The product of the relative frequencies, is a measure of the genetic variance.  The quantity pq is maximized when there is an equal frequency of each gene, when .  In the GSM, the rate of change  is proportional to the genetic variation.

The mean population fitness  is a measure of the overall fitness of the population.  In the GSM, the rate of change  is inversely proportional to the mean fitness —i.e. when the population is maximally fit, no further change can occur.

The remainder of the equation, refers to the mean effect of an allele substitution.  In essence, this term quantifies what effect genetic changes will have on fitness.

See also
Darwinian fitness
Hardy–Weinberg principle
Population genetics

References

Population genetics